Amy is a female given name, sometimes short for Amanda, Amelia, Amélie, or Amita.  In French, the name is spelled "Aimée".

People

A–E
 Amy Acker (born 1976), American actress
 Amy Vera Ackman, also known as Mother Giovanni (1886–1966), Australian hospital administrator
 Amy Adams (born 1974), American actress
 Amy Alcott (born 1956) – American Hall of Fame golfer
 Amy Archer-Gilligan, (1873–1962), American serial killer
 Amy Beach (1867–1944), American composer and pianist
 Amy Birnbaum (born 1975), American voice actress
 Amy Bishop (born 1965), American professor and mass shooter
 Amy Braverman, American statistician
 Amy Brenneman (born 1964), American actress
 Amy Bruckner (born 1991), American actress and singer
 Amy Callaghan (born 1992), British politician
 Amy Carmichael (1867–1951), British missionary to India
 Amy Castle (born 1990), American actress and internet personality
 Amy Cimorelli (born 1995), American singer
 Amy Carter (born 1967), American political activist
 Amy Chan (born 1962), Hong Kong actress and Cantopop singer
 Amy Chan (badminton) (born 1961), player from Hong Kong
 Amy Cheng, Singaporean actress
 Amy Cheung (artist), conceptual artist 
 Amy Cheung (writer) (born 1967), Hong Kong writer
 Amy Childs (born 1990), English reality TV star
 Amy Chow (born 1978), American retired gymnast
 Amy Chua (born 1962), Chinese-American law professor and writer
 Amy Cotton (born 1980), Canadian judoka
Amy Coney Barrett (born 1972), American Supreme Court Associate Justice
 Amy Dalby (1888–1969), British actress
 Amy Davidson (born 1979), American actress
 Amy Diamond (born 1992), Swedish singer
 Amy Dumas (born 1975), American singer, retired WWE professional wrestler

F–R
 Amy Fan (born 1971), Hong Kong-based actress
 Amy Fisher (born 1974), American criminal and cause célèbre
 Amy Garnett (born 1976), English rugby player
 Amy Goodman (born 1957), American journalist
 Amy Grant (born 1960), American Christian contemporary pop singer
 Amy Hargreaves (born 1970), American actress
 Amy Harvey (born 2002), Japanese singer and model from the girl group XG
 Amy Heidemann, (born 1986), American rapper and singer known professionally as Qveen Herby
 Amy Beth Hayes (born 1982), British actress
 Amy Faye Hayes (born 1973), American ring announcer and model
 Amy Harris, Australian ballet dancer
 Amy Heckerling (born 1954), American film director
 Amy Hempel (born 1951) American writer and journalist
 Amy Hennig (born 1964), video game director and script writer
 Amy Hill (born 1953), American actress
 Amy Holland (born 1953), American pop rock singer
 Amy Hastings (born 1976), track and field athlete
 Amy Irving (born 1953), American actress
 Amy Jackson (born 1992), English actress
 Amy Johnson (1903–1941), English aviator
 Amy Jo Johnson (born 1970), American actress, singer-songwriter and musician
 Amy Klobuchar (born 1960), a United States senator from Minnesota
 Amy Kremenek, American academic administrator
 Amy Kwok (born 1967), former Miss Hong Kong winner and actress based in Hong Kong
 Amy Lee (born 1981), American singer-songwriter, pianist and lead singer of Evanescence
 Amy Lee (saxophonist), American musician
 Amy Lindsay, American actress
 Amy Locane (born 1971), American actress
 Amy Lowell (1874–1925), American poet
 Amy Malek (c. 1979/1980), American scholar, and sociocultural anthropologist
 Amy McDonald (Scottish footballer) (born 1985), Scottish football player and coach
 Amy Macdonald (born 1987), British singer-songwriter
 Amy MacDonald, American author
 Amy Mainzer (born 1974), American astronomer
 Amy Malbeuf, Canadian-Métis visual artist, educator, and cultural tattoo practitioner
 Amy Meisak (born 1993), Scottish model and beauty pageant titleholder
 Amy Millan (born 1973), Canadian singer-songwriter
 Amy Miller (born 1980), Canadian filmmaker
 Amy Ndiaye, Senegalese politician
 Amy Nuttall (born 1982), British actress and singer
 Amy O'Neill (born 1971), American actress/performer.
 Amy Palmer (born 1975), American hammer thrower
 Amy Parkinson (1855–1938), Canadian poet
 Amy Parmenter (born 1997), Australian netball player
 Amy Pemberton (born 1988), British actress
 Amy Phillips (born 1978), British Comedian and impressionist
 Amy Poehler (born 1971), American comedian and actress
 Amy Purdy (born 1979), American Paralympic Snowboarder and TV Personality
 Amy Ray (born 1964), American singer-songwriter, half of the Indigo Girls duo
 Amy Redford (born 1970), American actress, daughter of Robert Redford
 Amy Robach (born 1973), American television journalist
 Amy Rodriguez (born 1987), American soccer player
 Amy Ryan (born 1968), American actress

S–Z
 Amy Sanderson (1876–1931), Scottish suffragette
 Amy Satterthwaite (born 1986), New Zealand cricketer
 Amy Schumer (born 1981), American comedian and actress
 Amy Schwartz (athlete) (born 1969), former American professional tennis player and amateur golfer
 Amy Schwartz (author) (1954 – 2023), American author and illustrator of children's books 
 Amy Schwartz Moretti (born  1975), American violinist
 Amy Sedaris (born 1961), American actress, author, and comedian
 Amy Seimetz (born 1981), American actress, writer, producer, director, and editor
 Amy Segerstedt (1835–1928), Swedish teacher, folk teacher, philanthropist
 Amy Sky (born 1960), Canadian singer-songwriter, record producer, theatre actress, and television host
 Amy Sloan (born 1978), Canadian actress
 Amy Soranno (born 1993/1994), Canadian animal rights activist
 Amy Smart (born 1976), American actress and fashion model
 Amy Spain (1848–1865), American slave
 Amy Spanger (born 1971), American actress
 Amy Spangler (born 1949), American activist
 Amy Spurway (born 1976), Canadian authour
 Amy Steel (born 1960), American actress
 Amy Studt (born 1986), British singer-songwriter
 Amy Summers (born 1963), American state representative from West Virginia
 Amy Tan (born 1952), American writer
 Amy Tinkler (born 1999), British gymnast
 Amy Tong (born 1977), American judoka
 Amy Veness (1876–1960), British actress
 Amy Vermeulen (born 1983), Canadian football (soccer) forward
 Amy Walker (born 1982), American actress and singer
 Amy Wax (born 1953), American law professor
 Amy Weber (born 1970), American model, singer, actress, and former WWE professional wrestler
 Amy Welborn (born 1960), an American author
 Amy Willerton (1992), English television presenter, model and beauty pageant titleholder
 Amy Williams (born 1982), British Olympic Skeleton champion
 Amy Winehouse (1983–2011), British singer-songwriter
 Amy Winfrey, American animator
 Amy Witting (born 1918–2001), Australian writer
 Amy Wong (producer), Hong Kong television drama producer
 Amy Wing-Hann Wong, Canadian visual artist
 Amy Wright (born 1950), American actress
 Amy Wyss (born 1970/1971), Swiss-American billionaire businesswoman and philanthropist.
 Amy Yasbeck (born 1962), American actress
 Amy Zegart (born 1967), American writer and academic
 Amy Zongo (born 1980), French athlete

Fictional characters 
 Amy, a character from Barney and the Backyard Gang.
 Amy, a character from Canadian teen drama series The Next Step.
 Amy, a character from Total Drama: Pahkitew Island.
 Amy, a character in the film Would You Rather.
 Amy the Amethyst Fairy, a character from the Rainbow Magic book franchise.
 Amy Alden, the main character and 13-year-old daughter of Aliane and Tom Alden in the film Fly Away Home.
 Amy Amanda Allen, reporter in The A-Team
 Amy Anderson, the civilian name of Sailor Mercury in the English dub of the popular anime, Sailor Moon.
 Amy Antsler, one of the main characters in the film Booksmart.
 Amy Barlow, character in soap opera Coronation Street.
 Amy Barnes, character in soap opera Hollyoaks.
 Amy Bendix, a character in The Punisher.
 Amy Bradshaw, the main character in D.E.B.S..
 Amy Cahill, one of the main characters of The 39 Clues series.
 Amy Dorrit, the main character in the novel Little Dorrit, also in a television serialisation of the novel.
 Amy Duncan, the main character in the TV show Good Luck Charlie Amy Elliott Dunne, the main character in Gone Girl by Gillian Flynn
 Amy Enker, titular character of Australian film Amy.
 Amy Farrah Fowler, a character in the American sitcom The Big Bang Theory.
 Amy Fleming Borden, the main character in the TV series  Heartland.
 Amy Gardner, lobbyist and the First Lady's Chief of Staff in The West Wing.
 Amy Gillis, a character in American TV series Clarence.
 Amy Gray, a judge in the television series Judging Amy.
 Amy Greene, Rachel Greene's younger sister in the TV series Friends.
 Amy Grimes, a character in the film Cyberbully.
 Patricia "Fat Amy" Hobart, a character from the Pitch Perfect film series.
 Amy Juergens, the main character in the teen show The Secret Life of the American Teenager.
 Amy Limietta, from the Magical Girl Lyrical Nanoha series.
 Amy MacDougall, Robert Barone's girlfriend on the sitcom Everybody Loves Raymond.
 Amy Madden / Havoc, main character in the Disney series The Villains of Valley View.
 Amy Madison, in the TV series Buffy the Vampire Slayer.
 Amy March, from the novel Little Women by Louisa May Alcott.
 Amy Matthews, Cory Matthews' mother in the TV series Boy Meets World.
 Amy Medford, the title character of Amy (1981 film), a Walt Disney Pictures live-action film.
 Amy Minoru, the older sister of Nico Minoru in the TV series Runaways.
 Amelia "Amy" Pond, companion of the Doctor in the TV series Doctor Who.
 Amy Pond, a character in the TV series Supernatural.
 Amy Raudenfeld, a main character in the TV series Faking It.
 Amy Rose, a character from the video game franchise Sonic the Hedgehog.
 Amy Santiago, a main character in the TV series Brooklyn Nine-Nine.
 Amy Sorel, a playable female character in the Soul series of fighting games.
 Amy Sosa, a main character in the NBC sitcom Superstore.
 Amy Squirrel, a main character in the film Bad Teacher.
 Amy Sutton, a character in the Sweet Valley High series.
 Amy Szalinski, a character from the Honey, I Shrunk the Kids franchise.
 Amy Warnicker, a character in the film Footloose.
 Amy Yuuzuki, a main character in the TV series Zyuden Sentai Kyoryuger''.

See also 
 
 
 Aimee
 Aime
 Ami (given name)

References 

English feminine given names
Given names
Hypocorisms